Tom and Jerry in New York is an American animated 
streaming television series that premiered on HBO Max on July 1, 2021 and ended on November 18, 2021. It is based on the Tom and Jerry characters and theatrical cartoon series created by William Hanna and Joseph Barbera and serves as a stand-alone sequel series to the film, Tom & Jerry, which was released in cinemas and HBO Max on February 26, 2021.

With episodes directed by Darrell Van Citters, the show has the same art style as The Tom and Jerry Show (2014) with the original crew returning along with William Hanna (via archive recordings) as the voices of Tom and Jerry.

Each episode is usually 21 minutes long: the first, second and fourth segments are 5 minutes long and the third segment runs 2 minutes.

It features the cast of William Hanna (archived recordings), Kath Soucie, Joey D'Auria, Rick Zieff and Sam Kwasman.

Plot
Set after the events of the 2021 film, the series follows Tom and Jerry having new adventures in the Royal Gate Hotel and all over New York City.

Voice cast
 William Hanna as:
 Tom Cat, a variously depicted as an adult blue/gray house cat doing his job, and a victim of Jerry's blackmail attempts, sometimes within the same short.
 Jerry Mouse, a young brown mouse who lives in the same house as Tom's owners, allowing chaos and destruction to ensue while he and Tom fight.
 Kath Soucie as Tuffy Mouse: The little, gray, nappy-wearing orphan mouse who is Jerry's ward.
 Joey D'Auria as Butch Cat: A black alley cat who is the leader of the alley cat bullies who are usually friends with Tom and help him catch Jerry.
 Rick Zieff as Spike: A muscular gray bulldog is generally amiable and friendly, and a loving father to his son Tyke.
 Sam Kwasman as Quacker: A little duckling who is very trusting, even trusting Tom in many situations in which Tom wishes to eat him.
 Rachael MacFarlane as Toodles Galore (credited as Toots), Gwennie, Riva McDiva
 Grey Griffin as Female Zoo Patron, Pigeon, Zoo Announcer
 Stephen Stanton as Concierge, Taxi Driver, Chameleon Owner, Shopkeeper, Hot Dog Vendor, Store Announcer
 Diane Michelle as Old Lady, Mrs. Vandarkashian
 Flula Borg as Gunnar
 Leslie David Baker as Mr. Piper
 Brian T. Delaney as Chapman, Zoo Guard
 Kimberly Brooks as Lt. General Mother
 Regi Davis as Sgt. Clayton T. McTabby, Ambassador's Husband
 Kurt Kanazawa as Digital Translator, Announcer
 Daniel Ross as Jimmy
 Laraine Newman as Rosie
 Kari Wahlgren as Mom
 Dee Bradley Baker as Pedestrian
 Chris Edgerly as Rolf, Rudy
 Trevor Devall as Tom's double
 Katie Leigh as Dowager, Young Girl
 Carlos Alazraqui as Robber
 Sandy Fox as Bird vocalizations

Episodes

Series overview

All episodes were directed by Darrell Van Citters.

Season 1 (2021)

Season 2 (2021)

Release
The series premiered in the United States on July 1, 2021 on HBO Max. In Canada, the series was premiered on September 18, 2021 on Teletoon. The second season premiered on November 18.

Internationally, the show is broadcast on Boomerang channels.

The series premiered on December 17, 2021 on HBO Max in Brazil and Latin America and later premiered on January 6, 2022 on Cartoon Network. It started airing in India also on March 19, 2022 on Cartoon Network.

Production

Development
On October 29, 2019, Tom and Jerry in New York was first shown during WarnerMedia's HBO Max conference demo live-stream event, where it was originally known as Tom and Jerry in the Big City and hidden away under Max Originals, fourth in a row alongside Craftopia, The Not-Too-Late Show with Elmo, and The Fungies!.

On May 28, 2020, on the official WarnerMedia Twitter, the day after the streaming service's launch date, posted a video of current and upcoming content heading to and/or on the site, among the end portion of the video listing next-year Max Originals and squeezed in-between Tig n' Seek and Circe, was Tom and Jerry under a new title of in the Big City.

On June 10, 2021, WarnerMedia officially announced the series with its original title of Tom and Jerry in New York, which premiered on HBO Max starting July 1, 2021.

Renegade Animation's Darrell Van Citters and Ashley Postelwaite who produced The Tom and Jerry Show during the last decade have returned in the same roles, with Van Citters also directing again.

See also
 The Tom and Jerry Show (1975)
 The Tom and Jerry Comedy Show
 Tom & Jerry Kids
 Tom and Jerry Tales
 The Tom and Jerry Show (2014)
 Tom and Jerry Special Shorts

References

External links

Notes

2020s American children's comedy television series
2020s American animated television series
2021 American television series debuts
2021 American television series endings
American flash animated television series
American children's animated comedy television series
Tom and Jerry television series
HBO Max original programming
Animated television series about cats
Animated television series about mice and rats
Television shows set in New York City
Television series by Warner Bros. Animation
Animated television shows based on films
Television series set in the 2020s